The premier of Manitoba is the first minister (i.e., head of government or chief executive) for the Canadian province of Manitoba—as well as the de facto President of the province's Executive Council.

In formal terms, the premier receives a commission to form a government from the Lieutenant Governor of Manitoba, who represents the monarch at the provincial level.

The 24th and current premier of Manitoba is Heather Stefanson (Progressive Conservative Party), who was sworn in on November 2, 2021.

Status and role
The premier of Manitoba is the head of the government, in that they are the head of the provincial party capable of winning a vote of confidence in the Legislative Assembly of Manitoba. In this sense, the role of the premier is the same as the prime minister, but at the provincial level.

After being sworn in, the premier organises a provincial cabinet (the Executive Council), which is formally appointed by the lieutenant governor (lg). Together, the premier and lieutenant governor are comparable to U.S. state governors: the lieutenant governor performs functions of state and protocol, such as signing bills into law, as the Queen's representative to the province; while the premier is responsible for overseeing the operations of government as head of the cabinet.

The premier also represents the province on a national level, and has talks with other premiers and the Prime Minister once a year.

Premiers of Manitoba

History 
The Province of Manitoba was created on 12 May 1870 with the passing of the Manitoba Act. The next month, on July 15, the Province was officially admitted into Confederation. On December 30 that year, the first election was held for the Manitoba's Legislative Assembly.

From 1870 to 1874, Manitoba was governed by its first two Lieutenant Governors (LG), Adams Archibald and Alexander Morris. As agents of the LGs, Alfred Boyd (1870–71) and Henry James Clark (1872–74), who are often named in various lists as the first Manitoba premiers, never actually held the title of "Premier." Accordingly, there has been debate as to whether the Office of Premier can be considered to have existed before Marc-Amable Girard's premiership that began in July 1874. Lieutenant Governor Morris recognized Girard as such in the following correspondence to the Secretary of State in Ottawa:

Additionally, Wab Kinew, Leader of Manitoba's New Democratic Party (NDP), introduced a bill in 2020 to formally recognize the founder of Manitoba, Louis Riel, as the province's first premier.

Until 1888, the administrations of Manitoba were non-partisan. That year, Thomas Greenway would become the first partisan and first Liberal premier of Manitoba, followed by Conservative Hugh John Macdonald. Progressivism would finally make its way to Manitoba's government in 1922, under the non-partisan United Farmers leader John Bracken, who held office for 20 years under various political and non-partisan labels.

Since the 1950s, Manitoba has alternated between governments led by the New Democrats (and predecessors) and by the Progressive Conservatives (PC; and predecessors). Moreover, throughout the province's history, all but one of its governments—Premier Sterling Lyon (1977–81)—have been elected to second terms.

In 2016, long-time conservative politician Brian Pallister became the 22nd premier of Manitoba, upending 17 years of NDP governance in the province. Pallister's landslide victory would follow the premiership of NDP Greg Selinger (2009–16), who Maclean's says has been regarded as Canada's "least popular premier." Following his election, according to the Angus Reid Institute, Pallister was the 2nd-most-popular premier in the country; however, his popularity would steadily decline since (with an approval rating of 37% two years into his mandate).

See also

Politics in Manitoba 

Leaders
 List of premiers of Manitoba
List of premiers of Manitoba by time in office
Deputy premier of Manitoba
List of lieutenant governors of Manitoba
List of mayors of Brandon
List of mayors of Winnipeg
Governors of the Red River Settlement (1812–70)
Legislature
Manitoba Legislature
Legislative Assembly of Manitoba
Speaker of the Legislative Assembly of Manitoba
Leader of the Opposition of Manitoba
 Monarchy in Manitoba
Lieutenant governor of Manitoba
 Legislative Council of Manitoba (1871–76)
Other

Manitoba Senators
Chief Justice of Manitoba

Politics in Canada 
 Politics of Canada
Prime Minister of Canada
 Premier (Canada)

References

Further reading

 Ferguson, Barry, and Robert Alexander Wardhaugh. 2010. Manitoba Premiers of 19th and 20th Centuries. Regina, SK: University of Regina Press. Preview.

External links
 Premier of Manitoba Official Site
"Premiers of Manitoba," Memorable Manitobans. Manitoba Historical Society.
"A list of premiers since Manitoba became a province." CTV News. Canadian Press. 2016 April 17.

 
Manitoba ministers